DiV Radio is a Bosnian radio station broadcasting from the city of Prijedor in Bosnia and Herzegovina. The station was founded on May 16, 2018, and predominantly broadcasts folk music and local news. The radio station owner, FreeMedia d.o.o. Prijedor, also operates the radio station Free Radio Prijedor, which was founded in 1997 and was the Prijedor area's first private/commercial radio station.

DiV Radio broadcasts in the local language, Serbian. Although it is based in Prijedor, it is also available in nearby municipalities in the Bosanska Krajina region, such as Kozarska Dubica, Bosanska Kostajnica, Novi Grad, and Oštra Luka. As of March 2021, DiV radio had approximately 80,000 listeners.

Frequencies
 Prijedor

See also 
 List of radio stations in Bosnia and Herzegovina
 Radio Prijedor
 Free Radio Prijedor
 Radio USK

References

External links 
 www.freeradioprijedor.com
 www.radiostanica.ba
 www.fmscan.org
 Communications Regulatory Agency of Bosnia and Herzegovina

Prijedor
Radio stations established in 2018
Prijedor